Kelvin John Mullarkey (29 March 1951 – 12 June 2018) was a motorcycle speedway rider from England, who spent most of his career with Rye House Rockets in the National League.

Mullarkey raced for nine consecutive seasons without missing a single meeting for Rye House from 1975 to 1983.

References

1951 births
2018 deaths
British speedway riders
English motorcycle racers
Sportspeople from Chelmsford
Rye House Rockets riders
King's Lynn Stars riders
Hull Vikings riders
Poole Pirates riders
Hackney Hawks riders
Canterbury Crusaders riders
Cradley Heathens riders
Swindon Robins riders
Exeter Falcons riders
Newport Wasps riders
Wolverhampton Wolves riders
Eastbourne Eagles riders
Reading Racers riders